Leptosphaeria libanotis is a plant pathogen found mainly in Europe. It is the teleomorph stage of the fungus Phoma rostrupii.

References 

Fungi described in 1876
Fungi of Europe
Fungal plant pathogens and diseases
Pleosporales